Amolops wuyiensis, commonly known as the Wuyi torrent frog, is a species of frog in the family Ranidae that is endemic to south-eastern China where it is found in Fujian, Anhui and Zhejiang provinces. Its name refers to the Wuyi Mountains in Fujian.

It occurs in large streams and the surrounding forest habitat. Though its numbers are in decline, it is not considered threatened by the IUCN.

References

Amphibians of China
wuyiensis
Endemic fauna of China
Amphibians described in 1975
Taxonomy articles created by Polbot